Limits is the second Mandarin studio album of Taiwanese Mandopop artist Lala Hsu. It was released on 3 September 2010 by AsiaMuse. The pre-order edition is released on 16 August 2010.

Background
On 29 May 2009, Lala Hsu released her self-titled debut album containing self-composed songs she performed in the third season of CTV's One Million Star. In the first episode, she performed her self-composed song for the first time, titled "The Rest of Love" which was not included in her previous album. She also performed "Perfume" during the finals, along with "Down in Sandbar" which was included in her previous album.

Track listing

References 

2010 albums
Lala Hsu albums
Rock Records albums